You Leave Me Breathless is the final album led by saxophonist Junior Cook which was recorded in 1991 and released on the SteepleChase label.

Reception 

The Allmusic review called it a "one of Junior Cook's finest sessions as a leader" stating "Tenor saxophonist Junior Cook's final recording, cut less than two months before his death, finds the veteran hard bop stylist in surprisingly prime form, taking upbeat solos and swinging hard".

Track listing 
 "Junior's Cook" (Junior Cook) – 6:34
 "Envoy" (Valery Ponomarev) – 8:14
 "Warm Valley" (Duke Ellington) – 8:59
 "Sweet Lotus Lips" (Mickey Tucker) – 7:19
 "Vierd Blues" (Miles Davis) – 9:58
 "You Leave Me Breathless" (Frederick Hollander) – 12:07
 "Fiesta Español" (Cedar Walton) – 6:50
 "Mr. P.C." (John Coltrane) – 5:48

Personnel 
Junior Cook – tenor saxophone
Valery Ponomarev – trumpet
Mickey Tucker – piano
John Webber – bass
Joe Farnsworth – drums

References 

Junior Cook albums
1992 albums
SteepleChase Records albums